Kashmiri cinema is the Kashmiri language-based film industry in the Kashmir Valley of the Indian administered union territory of Jammu and Kashmir. The first Kashmiri feature film, Mainz Raat, was released in 1964.

Kashmiri artists 

Kashmir is a shooting destination for Bollywood films, and Kashmiri actors are well known in Bollywood.  Some famous Kashmiri artists in films and television are:
Raaj Kumar
Zain Khan Durrani
Abrar Qazi
Sadia Khateeb
Jeevan
Kiran Kumar
Sanjay Suri
RJ Rafiq
Rahul Bhat
Hina Khan
Ayesha Jhulka, actress born in Srinagar
Sandeepa Dhar, actress born in Srinagar
Arjumman Mughal, actress from Nowshera, Jammu and Kashmir
Prerna Bhatt, actress born in Kashmir
Zaira Wasim, actress born in Srinagar
Katrina Kaif
Danish Renzu
Sunayana Kachroo
Sumit Raina
Aamir Bashir
Mir Sarwar
Anupam Kher  
Mudasir Dar, Director, Writer, Producer
Vidhu Vinod Chopra, Director
Hussein Khan, Director Actor 
Tariq Bhat, Director   
Zameer Ashai 
Shahid lateef
Bhasha Sumbli
Mohammad Yousuf Shahnaz, Director, Producer, Actor
Hakeem Javeed, Director, Producer, Writer, Actor

1960s to 1980s
The first Kashmiri feature film, (Mainz Raat, directed by Jagjiram Pal) was released in 1964. In 1972 Shayar-e-Kashmir Mahjoor, a biography of Kashmiri poet Mahjoor, was released. Made in Urdu and Kashmiri, the film was a joint venture of the Department of Information of Jammu and Kashmir and Indian filmmaker Prabhat Mukherjee. Babaji (directed by Jyoti Sarup) followed 39 years, but it was not screened in Kashmir. A 1989 film, Inqalaab, was not released due to the turbulent political situation at the time. Because of the 1989 insurgency, film production in Kashmir was halted and an unofficial screening ban imposed on Bollywood films.

Cinema closures
Before the eruption of militancy in the 1990s, Srinagar alone had about 10 cinema halls - Firdaus, Shiraz, Khayam, Naaz, Neelam, Shah, Broadway, Regal and Palladium.

Cinemas in Kashmir, including nine in Srinagar, were closed due to the 1989 insurgency. In 1996, due to efforts by the National Conference government, the Broadway, Regal and Neelam Cinemas showed Vidhu Vinod Chopra's Kareeb. After further attacks, conemas in Kashmir were closed and DVD film piracy flourished. Director Tariq Bhat worked hard to push Cinema Culture in Kashmir by organising movie screenings of his directorial debut film Zindagi Tumse (2019) 

 In September 2022, a multiplex was opened in Srinagar.

Television

Three television films have been produced in Kashmir: Rasool Mir (1974–75), directed by Bashir Badgami; Habba Khatoon (1977-1978), directed by Bashir Badgami and Arnimaal (1982–83), directed by Siraj Qureshi.

Documentaries
The first Kashmiri film shown at the Cannes Film Festival was Ezra Mir's 1952 documentary, Pamposh (Lotus). Inshallah, Kashmir is a 2012 documentary directed, produced and written by Ashvin Kumar. Other notable documentaries are Papa 2 (2000) and Ocean of Tears (2012). In 2017, documentary on Pragaash kashmiri girls band with focus on Women's rights in Jammu and Kashmir was released.

21st century
Several films were made post 2000. However only few of them had a proper release in theatres/cinema halls through proper distribution. Harud, Kashmir Daily and Half Widow are only films in this list and were released on the platform of PVR. Harud was made under A Chasing Tales Production, starring Raza Naji and Kashmir Daily under Seven Two Creations and Safdar Arts and Half Widow under Renzu Films and Gaya Arts.

Aamir Bashir, Hussein Khan and Danish Renzu have directed them respectively.

Akh Daleel Loolech (Love Story) starring Mir Sarwar, it was the first Kashmiri digital feature film, premiered in India in 2006. Directed by Aarshad Mushtaq, the historical drama explored the Kashmiri people's social and political struggles during the 19th century. In 2012, Kashmir's first 35mm feature film Partav directed by Dilnawaz Muntazir was released. This movie, Valley of Saints, a romantic drama set near Dal Lake in Srinagar and directed by Musa Syeed, addressed environmental issues surrounding the lake. Qouluf,the ensorcelled 2014 was a Kashmiri language film that was screened in many film festivals, the film had Bashir Dada in the lead role, the film was directed by Ali Emran and produced by Yaqut Mushtaq, the film tries to follow the internal and the external journey of the protagonist.

Kashmir Daily, Mir Sarwar played the leading character in this film,  he has also done several Bollywood films as well. Kashmir Daily is filmed in Hindi and Kashmiri and produced and directed by Hussein Khan, was scheduled for release in spring 2016 but ultimately released on 6th Jan 2018. Among few films which are ready is Bed No. 17 which is directed by Mir Sarwar and should release by the end of 2020

Revival efforts

Obstacles to reviving the Kashmiri film industry are the lack of financial and government support. However, some people are making independent films few examples are Harud, Kashmir Daily and Half Widow and these three films are the only ones so far which have released. In 2014 Kashmiri filmmaker Ali Emran decided to shoot a film in Kashmir based on The Fountainhead. Identity Card- Ek Lifeline (2014) by Kashmiri filmmaker Rahat Kazmi received three awards at the American International Film Festival. In November 2014, the film was released worldwide. According to the Prime Minister of India, reviving the Kashmiri film industry would provide jobs for Kashmiri youth. In May 2015, Salman Khan said during the filming of Bajrangi Bhaijaan which had some actors from Kashmir like Mir Sarwar, Bashir Bhawani etc. that Kashmiri cinemas should be re-opened. Imtiaz Ali praised the state government for encouraging filmmakers in the valley after Chief Minister Mufti Mohammad Sayeed visited Mumbai to meet with Bollywood industry figures.

Inox Gold Class, a three-screen multiplex is situated adjacent to Srinagar's famous cinema hall of yesteryears called the Broadway cinema. This is the first multiplex in Kashmir and has been built by M/s Taksal Hospitality Pvt Ltd company in Shivpora in the Badami Bagh cantonment area of Srinagar which is owned by Vijay Dhar. It is here to mention that Mr. Dhar also runs Delhi Public School, Srinagar. The Inox Gold Multiplex was inaugurated by LG Manoj Sinha on September 20, 2022, later after the function the first film screened here to the journalists and selected audience was Laal Singh Chaddha. The cinema was thrown open for general public on 30 September, the films released were Vikram Vedha and Ponniyin Selvan:I.

Jadooz, the Chennai-based startup company which sets up mini theatres in rural pockets of India has opened two mini theatres in Pulwama and Shopian.

Cinemas in Kashmir Valley

Kashmir has only one multiplex cinema:
 INOX Multiplex Cinemas, Sonwar Srinagar.  While as there are several multiplexes in Jammu:

Cinemas in Jammu Region
 MovieTime Cinemas in Palm Island Mall, Jammu.
 PVR Cinemas, KC Jammu.
 Wave Cinemas, Jammu.
 Apsara Multiplex, Jammu
 AMR Multiplex, Katra
 Moonlight Cineplex, Kathua
 Raj Theatre, Udhampur

Kashmir film festivals
Kashmir World Film Festival (KWFF) is annual seven day Film festival held at Srinagar.
Verite Film Festival (Kashmir) is held at Awantipora.

See also
Music of Kashmir
Kashmiri literature
Kus Bani Koshur Karorpaet
Sheen (film)
Dogri cinema

References

External links
Kashmir gets its first-ever multiplex in Srinagar,
Kashmir gets its first-ever multiplex in Srinagar, to be opened for public
Should cinemas theatres be reopened in Kashmir?

 
Kashmiri language